I'll Give All My Love to You is the second studio album by the American R&B recording artist Keith Sweat. It was released on June 12, 1990, and went to number one on the Top R&B albums chart and number 6 on the Billboard 200.  It spawned Sweat's second and third number 1 R&B hits: "Make You Sweat" and the title track (both Top 20 pop hits), while "Merry Go Round" and "Your Love Part 2" were Top 5 R&B hits.
  
This was the last Keith Sweat album under Vincent Davis' Vintertainment label, which severed ties with Elektra soon after the release of this album. On March 7, 1991, I'll Give All My Love to You was certified double platinum by the RIAA, for shipments of two million copies in the United States. The single "Make You Sweat" was certified gold by the RIAA on October 4, 1990, for shipments of 500,000 copies in the United States.

Critical reception 

In a review upon the album's release, Rolling Stone gave it three-and-a-half out of five stars and commented that "this album discusses love, lost, found and reclaimed, and lust over grinding, pounding synth grooves". In his consumer guide for The Village Voice, the critic Robert Christgau gave the album a "dud" rating, indicating "a bad record whose details rarely merit further thought". The Los Angeles Times writer Connie Johnson wrote, "Sweat's debut album Make It Last Forever caught fire largely because of producer Teddy Riley, and his absence is strongly felt on this Sweat-produced follow-up". Greg Sandow of Entertainment Weekly complimented Sweat's vocals and singing style, but wrote that "despite all this passion, there's no obvious pop hit on the record [...] Most of the tracks sound interchangeably slow and steamy". In a retrospective review, Allmusic editor Alex Henderson called the album "a respectable disc that sounds consistently heartfelt and sincere", writing that "For all its high-tech production gloss and use of hip-hop elements, this self-produced CD reminds you that Sweat is quite aware of the great soul music of the 1970s".

Track listing

Personnel
Credits adapted from AllMusic.
Keith Sweat – lead vocals, background vocals, keyboards (tracks 5 and 6), producer, mixing
Teddy Riley – keyboards, producer, drum programming, mixing
Jacci McGhee – vocals (track 8), background vocals
Gerald Levert – performer
John Adams – keyboards
Thor Baldursson – keyboards, saxophone, drum programming
Charles "Poogie" Bell, Jr. – drum programming
Bobby Douglas – keyboards
Bobby Wooten – keyboards, producer, engineer, mixing

Charts

Weekly charts

Year-end charts

Certifications

See also
List of number-one R&B albums of 1990 (U.S.)

References

External links 
 I'll Give All My Love to You at Discogs

1990 albums
Albums produced by Teddy Riley
Elektra Records albums
Keith Sweat albums